Ariane Lavigne (born 8 October 1984 at Sainte-Agathe-des-Monts, Quebec) is a Canadian snowboarder. She competed in the slalom events at the 2014 Winter Olympics for Canada.

References

1984 births
Canadian female snowboarders
Living people
Olympic snowboarders of Canada
People from Sainte-Agathe-des-Monts
Snowboarders at the 2014 Winter Olympics
Sportspeople from Quebec